Nicolò Napoli (born 7 February 1962) is an Italian professional football manager and former player, who is currently in charge of Liga I club FC U Craiova.

Coaching career
Napoli was born in Palermo. A former professional player with several Serie A teams, including Juventus F.C., he moved to Romania in 2007 to work as a manager with Liga I outfit Universitatea Craiova. On 5 July 2009, he then accepted an offer from another Liga I club, FC Brașov, only to leave it three weeks later due to family issues.

On 20 August 2009, he signed a one-year contract (with an option for a further one-year extension) with Liga I team Astra Ploiești. He did not finish his contract, being sacked in April 2010. In 2011, he returned to Craiova for a third spell, but was sacked because of poor results.

In September 2012, Napoli came back to Romania, accepting the offer to manage the newly promoted in Liga I, CS Turnu Severin. He signed a contract until the end of the year, and the agreement wasn't renewed.

At the end of June 2013, he signed an agreement on three seasons with FC U Craiova club which he returns for the fourth time in his career. He was sacked in February 2014.

On 13 October 2014, he reached an agreement with Politehnica Iași.

Honours

Player
Messina
Serie C2: 1982–83
Serie C1: 1985–86

Juventus
Coppa Italia: 1989–90
UEFA Cup: 1989–90

References

External links
Playing career profile 

1967 births
Living people
Footballers from Palermo
Association football fullbacks
Italian footballers
Benevento Calcio players
Cavese 1919 players
A.C.R. Messina players
Juventus F.C. players
Cagliari Calcio players
Reggina 1914 players
Serie A players
Serie B players
Serie C players
Italian football managers
FC Brașov (1936) managers
FC Astra Giurgiu managers
FC Politehnica Iași (2010) managers
FC U Craiova 1948 managers
Liga I managers
Liga II managers
Expatriate football managers in Romania
Italian expatriate sportspeople in Romania
UEFA Cup winning players